Harry Keegan (born 12 January 1952) is an Irish retired Gaelic footballer who played as a corner back for the Roscommon senior team.

Keegan made his debut for Roscommon in 1972 in a league game against Kilkenny and was a regular member of the starting fifteen until his retirement in 1988. 

During that time he won five Connacht Senior Football Championship medals and three All-Star awards in 1978, 1980 and 1986.

He also won a National Football League medal in 1979 although he did not play in the final  against Cork due to injury.

References

1950 births
Living people
Roscommon inter-county Gaelic footballers